Francisco Moraleda Suárez (5 January 1901 in Guadalajara) was a Spanish footballer who played as a forward. As a player, he represented both Real Madrid and Atlético Madrid.

Club career
Born in Guadalajara, he nearly became the first-ever player born in that region to play in La Liga, but when he belonged to Real Madrid (1925-1928), the national league championship had not yet been created (the first season was in 1929), and when he joined Atlético in the 1930–31 season, the team had just been relegated to the Segunda División, so twice Moraleda missed the honor of being the first player from Guadalajara to play in the First Division. In his three years at Real, he helped the club to win three back-to-back regional championships between 1925 and 1928. In 1928, the club's board of directors decided that his low form did not allow him to continue defending Madrid's colors and dismissed him, and eventually Moraleda ended up in the neighboring club, Atlético Madrid.

International career
Moraleda earned one international cap, but with the Spanish B team, in a game held at the Metropolitano on 29 May 1927, against Portugal's A side. Moreover, Moraleda was not even a starter, but he came on after the break and scored the opening goal in an eventual 2–0 win.

References

1901 births
Year of death missing
People from Guadalajara, Spain
Sportspeople from the Province of Guadalajara
Footballers from Castilla–La Mancha
Spanish footballers
Real Madrid CF players
Atlético Madrid footballers
La Liga players
Segunda División players
Spain international footballers